Kifissia V.C. (Kifissia Volleyball Club;  , former Α.Ο. Κηφισιάς) is a volleyball club which was founded in 1932 in Kifissia, Athens, Greece. The club was firstly founded under the name A.O. Kifissia but in 2015, it absorbed Metamorfosi V.C. and renamed A.O.P Kifissia (Athlitikos Omilos Petosferisis Kifissias/Kifissia Volleyball Club). The club plays at the Zirineio Indoor Ball, which holds 800 people.  

The team plays at the A1 division of the Greek Volleyball Championships. The club ranked 6th in the 2007–08 season, while in 2013-2014 it ended up in the third place of the league, the best result in its history. A.O. Kifissia also took the second place in the Balkan Championships.

Recent seasons
During the last eight years, Kifissia has played continually in the A1 Ethniki. It usually finishes in medium or low places of the championship.

Honours
Greek Volleyball Cup
Finalist (3): 2014, 2016, 2017
Greek Volleyball League Cup
Finalist (1): 2013
Balkan Volleyball Championships:
2008-09: 2nd

Current squad
2016–2017 roster

References

External links
Kifissia at the Greek Volleyball League
Athlitikos Kosmos, No. 6 (13/6/1926), p.7 
Athlitikos Kosmos, No. 38 (23/1/1927), p.5 
Athlitikos Kosmis, No. 46 (20-3-1927), p.3" 

1932 establishments in Greece
Greek volleyball clubs
Sports clubs in Athens
Volleyball clubs established in 1932